Queenstown Road is a railway station in inner south-west London,  south-west of , between  and . It is a short walk from Battersea Park station and Battersea Park to the west. It has three platforms, two of which are in use by all stopping services related to the Waterloo to Reading Line: its branch services to Weybridge (via Hounslow) and two separate sets of bidirectional Waterloo-to-Waterloo services via Hounslow using the Hounslow Loop and via Kingston using the Kingston Loop.  In addition, 50% of maximum peak hour trains serving the Shepperton branch line call at the station.

History
The station was opened on 1 November 1877, by the London and South Western Railway, as Queen's Road (Battersea). The entrance still bears the name Queen's Road, not to be confused with Queens Road Peckham, Walthamstow Queen's Road or Queensway Underground station, which was also originally called Queens Road.

Queen's Road was also the name of the road in which the station is located. Named after Queen Victoria, after the Second World War the street's name was changed to Queenstown Road. The station was renamed Queenstown Road (Battersea), to go with the road, on 12 May 1980. The station's modern entrance and platform signage lacks the "(Battersea)" suffix that appears in timetables and on some maps. The latest "Oyster Rail Services" map produced by Transport for London shows the station as plain "Queenstown Road". On the map produced by the station managers, South West Trains, the station is called "Queenstown Road".

Services 
Queenstown Road is on the early stage of the South West Main Line but with only 2 platforms in use. The off-peak frequency in trains per hour is:
Northbound:
8 to London Waterloo
Southbound:
2 to Weybridge via Hounslow and Staines
4 on the Hounslow Loop back to London Waterloo:
2 clockwise via Richmond and Hounslow
2 anti-clockwise via Hounslow and Richmond
2 on the Kingston Loop (anti-clockwise) via Richmond and Kingston, back to London Waterloo

Connections
London Buses routes 137, 156, 452 and night route N137 serve the station.

Future
Network Rail plans to reopen Platform 1 at Queenstown Road to permit the segregation of Windsor and Mainline services flows, providing additional capacity on the approach to London Waterloo.

Notes

References

External links 

Railway stations in the London Borough of Wandsworth
DfT Category F1 stations
Railway stations in Great Britain opened in 1877
Former London and South Western Railway stations
Railway stations served by South Western Railway
Buildings and structures in Battersea